Peter-No-Tail in Americat is a 1985 Swedish animation based on stories about the tail-less cat Pelle Svanslös by Gösta Knutsson. The cartoon is a sequel to the 1981 cartoon Peter-No-Tail, and is known in Sweden for its extremely surreal content.

Plot 

Peter-No-Tail (Pelle Svanslös) is a cat without a tail, being bit off by a rat when he was a kitten. He compensates for this by studying hard, and much to the dismay of his arch-rival Magnus (Måns), he receives a high university degree that few cats in the university town of Uppsala, Sweden, have obtained. In the movie, he is visited by his American relative Pelle Swanson, who invites him to visit his new home country, the United States, in the movie called Americat. There everything is bigger; even the rats are much fatter.

The movie is mainly about what happens to someone from another country who is not used to the life in a big city. Nevertheless, Peter-No-Tail is still a kindhearted cat to everyone, even if the other cats are not nice to him. Everything seems possible in America, even the prospect of finally having a proper tail and a sweetheart to call one's own.

The movie has many surreal elements, as when Peter encounters large ghetto-rats that try to eat him, the famous church of Uppsala turning into a huge cat, and a Native American cat that uses magic to give him a long, golden tail, earning him the nickname of "Peter Gold-Tail."

Cast

References

External links 
 
 

Films based on Swedish novels
Swedish children's films
Swedish animated films
1985 films
Animated films about cats
Films set in the United States
Films set in Uppsala
Atlantic Entertainment Group films
1980s children's animated films
1980s Swedish films